Kate Gompert (born January 11, 1963) is a former professional tennis player from the U.S.

Gompert reached the fourth round at the US Open in 1985. She had a career record of 77–78. She had a career high singles ranking of world no. 18 in July 1987. Her biggest career win happened in 1987 at the Virginia Slims of Florida when she upset Chris Evert.

Author and tennis enthusiast David Foster Wallace used Gompert's name for an otherwise unrelated character in his novel Infinite Jest.

WTA Tour finals

Singles: 1 (0–1)

References

External links
 
 

1963 births
Living people
American female tennis players
People from Ames, Iowa
Stanford Cardinal women's tennis players
Tennis people from Iowa